Mulberry Grove is a historic home located near Cornwall, Rockbridge County, Virginia, USA. It was built in 1796, and is a two-story, three bay, stone I-house dwelling.  It has a side gable roof, exterior end chimneys, and a bold cornice decorated with modillions and dentils. A two-story frame addition and one-story porch were added about 1900. The property includes a contributing bank barn and granary, both erected around 1900.

It was listed on the National Register of Historic Places in 1994.

References

Houses on the National Register of Historic Places in Virginia
Houses completed in 1796
Houses in Rockbridge County, Virginia
National Register of Historic Places in Rockbridge County, Virginia
1796 establishments in Virginia